Anthropology of art is a sub-field in social anthropology dedicated to the study of art in different cultural contexts. The anthropology of art focuses on historical, economic and aesthetic dimensions in non-Western art forms, including what is known as 'tribal art'.

History
Franz Boas, one of the pioneers of modern anthropology, conducted many field studies of the arts, helping create a foundation to the field. His book, Primitive Art (1927), summarizes his main insights into so-called 'primitive' art forms, with a detailed case study on the arts of the Northwest Pacific Coast. The famous anthropologist Claude Lévi-Strauss took Boas' analyses further in his book The Way of the Masks, where he traced changes in the plastic form of Northwest Pacific masks to patterns of intercultural interaction among the indigenous peoples of the coast.

Essential contributions made to the field of art anthropology by M.N. Haidle showcase the biological changes necessary for humans to evolve creative capacities. These changes include precise hand-eye coordination, improvements in information processing systems, improved aesthetic awareness and prioritization, process-oriented teaching, advancements in communication, and the application of abstract concepts. Individuals that have developed such structural and cognitive advancements are enabled to produce art and will be evolutionarily selected for. Ellen Dissanayake has published work which contributes to this concept and suggests that creativity was practiced by only the most fit individuals within a population. Since artistic involvement is not an essential duty, it could only be produced once survival tasks were completed, and therefore, individuals with the highest fitness could partake. This exemplifies the selection of artistic individuals, since fitness is concomitant with participation in leisure activity. Gillian Morriss-Kay addressed preliminary artistic patters like zig-zag, criss-cross, and parallel lines. Use of patterns indicate advancements in cognition and signify an evolutionary step towards increasing complexity in imaginative capability. Early interpretations of the human form, as seen in the Venus Figurines and the Lion-Man reflect this evolutionary step by indicating awareness of anatomy and the function of symbolism.

The Problem of Art
One of the central problems in the anthropology of art concerns the universality of 'art' as a cultural phenomenon. Several anthropologists have noted that the Western categories of 'painting', 'sculpture', or 'literature', conceived as independent artistic activities, do not exist, or exist in a significantly different form, in most non-Western contexts. Thus, there is no consensus on a single, cross-cultural definition of 'art' in anthropology. To surmount this difficulty, anthropologists of art have focused on formal features in objects which, without exclusively being 'artistic', have certain evident 'aesthetic' qualities. Boas' Primitive Art, Claude Lévi-Strauss' The Way of the Masks (1982) or Geertz's 'Art as Cultural System' (1983) are some examples in this trend to transform the anthropology of 'art' into an anthropology of culturally-specific 'aesthetics'. More recently, in his book Art and Agency, Alfred Gell proposed a new definition of 'art' as a complex system of intentionality, where artists produce art objects to effect changes in the world, including (but not restricted to) changes in the aesthetic perceptions of art audiences. Gell's ideas have stirred a large controversy in the anthropology of art in the 2000s.

Bibliography
Boas, Franz. (1927) Primitive Art. New York: Dover
Coote, Jeremy and Anthony Shelton, eds. (1992) Anthropology Art and Aesthetics. Oxford: Clarendon Press 
Descola, Philippe. (2021) Les formes du visible : une anthropologie de la figuration. Paris: Editions du Seuil.
Dissanayake, E. 1974. A hypothesis of the evolution of art from play. Leonardo 7(3) : 211–217. https://www.jstor.org/stable/1572893 
Forge, Anthony, ed. (1973) Primitive Art & Society. Oxford: Oxford University Press
Forge, Anthony. (1979) The Problem of Meaning in Art, in Exploring the Visual Art of Oceania. Sidney M. Mead, ed. Honolulu: Hawaii University Press, pp. 278–286
Geertz, Clifford. (1983). Art as a Cultural System, in Local Knowledge: Further Essays in Interpretive Anthropology. New York: Basic Books
Gell, Alfred. (1998) Art and Agency: An Anthropological Theory of Art. Oxford: Oxford University Press 
Haidle, M.N. (2014). Examining the evolution of artistic capacities: searching for mushrooms? In Sütterlin, Christa, Wulf Schiefenhövel, Christian Lehmann, Johanna Forster & Gerhard Apfelauer (eds.), Art as behaviour. An ethological approach to visual and verbal art, music and architecture. Bis-Verlag der Carl von Ossietzky Universität Oldenburg, Oldenburg, 237–251. Available from: https://www.researchgate.net/profile/Miriam_Haidle/publication/279253079_Examining_the_evolution_of_artistic_capacities_searching_for_mushrooms/links/5673f83b08aee7a427459d44.pdf 
Hatcher, Evelyn Payne. (1985) Art As Culture: An Introduction to the Anthropology of Art. Lanham: University Press of America 
Layton, Robert. (1981) The Anthropology of Art. Cambridge: Cambridge University Press 
Lévi-Strauss, Claude. (1982) The Way of the Masks, translated by Sylvia Modelski. Seattle: University of Washington Press
Marcus, George and Myers, Fred "The traffic in Culture: Refiguring Art and Anthropology". University of California, California 2008
Morphy, Howard and Morgan Perkins, eds. (2006) The Anthropology of Art: A Reader. Malden, MA: Blackwell Publishing
Morriss-Kay, G.M. 2010. The evolution of human artistic creativity. Journal of Anatomy 216(2) : 158–176.
Munn, Nancy. (1973) Walpiri Iconography. Ithaca: Cornell University Press
Price, Sally. (1989) Primitive Art in Civilized Places. Chicago: University of Chicago Press

See also
Sociology of art

References

External links
 Anthropology of Art at Oxford Brooks University

Art
Visual arts theory
Art history
Symbolic anthropology